The term "Super Outbreak" has been widely used in reference to two extremely violent and deadly tornado outbreaks during 1974 and 2011 in the United States, and to a lesser extent a third outbreak in 1932.

1974 Super Outbreak
2011 Super Outbreak
1932 Deep South tornado outbreak – Referred to as a "Super Outbreak" by the National Weather Service office in Birmingham, Alabama.

See also

 Outbreak (disambiguation)
 Super (disambiguation)

+